Jouni Juhani Kotiaho (born 23 February 1958) is a Finnish politician currently serving in the Parliament of Finland for the Finns Party at the Central Finland constituency. Kotiaho is an entrepreneur in the transport sector.

References

1958 births
Living people
Members of the Parliament of Finland (2019–23)
Finns Party politicians
21st-century Finnish politicians